The Cunene horse mackerel (Trachurus trecae) is a species named after mackerel in the family Carangidae. Their maximum reported length is 35 cm, and the maximum reported weight is 2.0 kg. This species occurs inn the eastern Atlantic from Morocco south to Angola.

Fisheries

Notes

Cunene horse mackerel
Fish of the East Atlantic
Marine fauna of West Africa
Cunene horse mackerel
Taxa named by Jean Cadenat